Eagle Rock is a neighborhood of Northeast Los Angeles, abutting the San Rafael Hills in Los Angeles County, California.
Eagle Rock is named after Eagle Rock, a large boulder whose shadow resembles an eagle. Eagle Rock was once part of the Rancho San Rafael under Spanish and Mexican governorship. In 1911, Eagle Rock was incorporated as a city, and in 1923 it combined with the City of Los Angeles.

The neighborhood is the home of Occidental College and is known for being an enclave of counterculture. As with other neighborhoods in Northeast Los Angeles, Eagle Rock experienced significant gentrification in the 21st century.

History

Before the arrival of European settlers, the secluded valley below the San Rafael Hills that is roughly congruent to Eagle Rock's present boundaries was inhabited by the Tongva people, whose staple food was the acorns from the valley's many oak trees. These aboriginal inhabitants were displaced by Spanish settlers in the late 18th century, with the area incorporated into the Rancho San Rafael. Following court battles, the area known as Rancho San Rafael was divided into 31 parcels in 1870. Benjamin Dreyfus was awarded what is now called Eagle Rock. In the 1880s Eagle Rock existed as a farming community.

The arrival of American settlers and the growth of Los Angeles resulted in steadily increasing semi-rural development in the region throughout the late 19th century. The construction of Henry Huntington's Los Angeles Railway trolley line up Eagle Rock Boulevard to Colorado Boulevard and on Colorado to Townsend Avenue commenced the rapid suburbanization of the Eagle Rock Valley.

Although Eagle Rock—which is geographically located between the cities of Pasadena and Glendale—was once incorporated as Eagle Rock City in 1911, it was thereafter annexed to the City of Los Angeles in 1923 due to need for an adequate water supply and a high school.

Several of the major crime sprees that have become part of Los Angeles' late 20th century history have left their mark on the neighborhood. An early victim of the Hillside Strangler was discovered in an Eagle Rock neighborhood on October 31, 1977. The discovery, along with the successive murders of at least 10 other women in the area over the course of five months, rocked what was then a small, close-knit community on the outskirts of Los Angeles. In an opinion piece to the Los Angeles Times on December 6, 1977, a resident under the pseudonym Deirdre Blackstone wrote of the fear experienced by the community: "Groups of gum-chewing girls in look-alike hairdos and jeans who used to haunt the Eagle Rock Plaza — they too are keeping close to home ... We are all afraid. For women living alone, ours is an actual visceral fear that starts at the feet. Then it hits the knees — and finally it grips the mind." Two men, Kenneth Bianchi and Angelo Buono, were subsequently convicted of the murders.

On the night of March 20, 1985, an 8-year-old girl was abducted from her home in Eagle Rock and sexually assaulted by a man dubbed the "Valley Intruder," "Walk-in Killer" and "The Night Stalker," later identified as Richard Ramirez. This was the seventh in a long string of murders and sexual assaults committed by Ramirez in Los Angeles and San Francisco before he was apprehended.

In 2002, an effort to designate an area of the community as "Philippine Village" for the large Filipino American population was stopped.

Like the surrounding areas of Northeast Los Angeles, Eagle Rock has undergone gentrification. Beginning in the 2000s and picking up speed in the 2010s, the “authentic urbanism” and “small-town intimacy” of the area's boulevards have played a role in drawing young professionals and fostering an emergent hipster culture. As a result, housing prices have dramatically risen and a new wave of restaurants, coffee shops, bars, and art galleries have appeared over the last decade.

Demographics

The neighborhood is inhabited by a wide variety of ethnic and socioeconomic groups and the creative class. Over the past decade the Eagle Rock and neighboring Highland Park have been experiencing gentrification as young urban professionals have moved from nearby neighborhoods such as Los Feliz and Silver Lake. A core of counter-culture writers, artists and filmmakers has existed in Eagle Rock since the 1920s.

According to the "Mapping L.A." project of the Los Angeles Times, the 2000 U.S. census counted 32,493 residents in the   Eagle Rock neighborhood — or 7,644 people per square mile, an average population densities for both the city and the county. In 2008, the city estimated that the population had increased to 34,466. In 2000 the median age for residents was 35, about average for city and county neighborhoods.

The neighborhood was considered "highly diverse" ethnically within Los Angeles, with a relatively high percentage of Asian people. The breakdown was Latinos, 40.3%; whites, 29.8%; Asians, 23.9%; blacks, 1.8%; and others, 4.1%.  The Philippines (35.1%) and Mexico (25.1%) were the most common places of birth for the 38.5% of the residents who were born abroad—an average figure for Los Angeles.

The median yearly household income in 2008 dollars was $67,253, considered high for the city. The neighborhood's income levels, like its ethnic composition, can still be marked by notable diversity, but typically ranges from lower-middle to upper-middle class. Renters occupied 43.9% of the housing stock, and house- or apartment-owners held 56.1%. The average household size of 2.8 people was considered normal for Los Angeles.

Thirty percent of Eagle Rock residents aged 25 and older had earned a four-year degree by 2000, an average percentage for the city.

Geography
Eagle Rock is bordered by the City of Glendale on the north and west, Highland Park on the southeast, Glassell Park on the southwest and the cities of Pasadena and South Pasadena on the east.  Major thoroughfares include Eagle Rock Boulevard and Colorado Boulevard, with Figueroa Street along the eastern boundary. The Glendale and Ventura freeways run along the district's western and northern edges, respectively.

Landmarks

The neighborhood is home to many historic and architecturally significant homes, many done in the Craftsman, Georgian, Streamline Moderne, Art Deco and Mission Revival styles. There are nine Los Angeles Historic-Cultural Monuments in Eagle Rock:
 The Eagle Rock - located at the terminus of Figueroa Street, it is Historic-Cultural Monument #10. 
 Eagle Rock City Hall - Located at 2035 Colorado Boulevard, it is Historic-Cultural Monument #59. Once a separate municipality, this was Eagle Rock's original City Hall. 
 Eagle Rock Branch Library - Located at 2225 Colorado Boulevard, it is  Historic-Cultural Monument #292. The original library, which was built with the aid of a Carnegie grant in 1914, was replaced in 1927 with a new structure which used one wall and the basement of the old library. It now serves as the Center for the Arts Eagle Rock.
 Residence at 1203-1207 Kipling Avenue - It is Historic-Cultural Monument #383.
 Loleta House - Located on Loleta Avenue, it is a cultural hub and home to the Loleta Boys.
 Argus Court - Located at 1760-1768 Colorado Boulevard, it is Historic-Cultural Monument #471.
 Eagle Rock Playground Clubhouse - Located at 1100 Eagle Vista Drive , it is Historic-Cultural Monument #536.
 Eagle Rock Women's Twentieth Century Clubhouse - Located at 1841-1855 Colorado Boulevard, it is Historic-Cultural Monument #537.
 Swanson House - Located at 2373 Addison Way, it is Historic-Cultural Monument #542.
 Eagle Rock Women's Christian Temperence Union Home - Located at 2222-2244 Laverna Avenue & 2225-2245 Norwalk Avenue, it is Historic-Cultural Monument #562.

Parks and recreation
 Eagle Rock Recreation Center - 1100 Eagle Vista Dr., Los Angeles, CA 90041
 Eagle Rock Dog Park - 1100 Eagle Vista Drive Los Angeles, CA 90041.
 Eagle Rock Hillside Park - North of the Ventura Freeway and South of Valle Vista, Los Angeles, CA 90041.
 Richard Alatorre Park - Figueroa and 134 Freeway, Los Angeles, CA 90041.
 Yosemite Recreation Center - 1840 Yosemite Dr., Los Angeles, CA 90041.

Education

Higher education
Eagle Rock is the site of Occidental College, which was first established in Boyle Heights in 1887, but a fire destroyed its original site in 1896; from there the college moved to a temporary location in Downtown Los Angeles until 1898 when it moved to Highland Park, and then to Eagle Rock in 1914. The campus was designed by architect Myron Hunt.

Schools
Eagle Rock children attend schools in District 4  of the Los Angeles Unified School District.

 Eagle Rock High School, 1750 Yosemite Drive. Eagle Rock High School was built in 1927 by the City of Los Angeles, as promised at the time of Eagle Rock's annexation.  The building was demolished in 1970 over concerns about its earthquake safety. It was replaced by a contemporary brutalist style building at the rear of the same school site.
 Renaissance Arts Academy, charter high school, 1800 Colorado Boulevard
 Dahlia Heights Elementary School, 5063 Floristan Avenue
 Santa Rosa Charter Academy, middle school, 3838 Eagle Rock Boulevard
 Eagle Rock Elementary School, 2057 Fair Park Avenue
 Rockdale Elementary School, 1303 Yosemite Drive
 Delevan Drive Elementary School, 4168 West Avenue 42
 Toland Way Elementary School, 4545 Toland Way
 Annandale Elementary School, 6125 Poppy Peak Drive
 Celerity Rolas Charter School, 1495 Colorado Boulevard. Closed for 2018–2019 school year.

In popular culture 
Eagle Rock locations appear in Top Gun, The Hunt for Red October, and a second-season episode of The O.C. Star Trek III was partially filmed on the campus of Occidental College. Other movies filmed almost entirely in Eagle Rock include; all of the exterior scenes of The Incredible Shrinking Woman (1981) starring Lily Tomlin, Record City (1978) with Ed Begley Jr. was filmed in its entirety in a defunct auto paint shop, and The Unwed Father (1974) starring Joseph Bottoms and Kay Lenz had all of its exterior location shots filmed on the Eagle Rock High School campus.

 This Is Us - Pearson family home, 5223 Shearin Avenue.
 Reservoir Dogs - Pat and Lorraine's Coffee Shop, 4720 Eagle Rock Boulevard.
 Clueless - Occidental College.
 Beverly Hills, 90210 - Occidental College served as "California University".
 Aquarius - Cindy's coffee shop, 1500 Colorado Boulevard.
 Pharrell's music video "Happy" -  locations include the CVS Pharmacy on Eagle Rock Blvd., Eagle Rock High School and the All-Star Lanes.
  Avril Lavigne's music video "Complicated" - locations include the Eagle Rock Plaza Mall.

Notable residents

 Ben Affleck, a former Occidental College student, lived on Hill Drive with then-roommate and co-writer Matt Damon while they wrote the script for ''Good Will Hunting'.
 Maria Bamford (comedian)
 Marlon Brando (actor)
 Mike Carter (American-Israeli basketball player)
 John Dwyer (musician)
 Zack de la Rocha (musician)
 Paul Ecke (botanicals)
 M.F.K. Fisher (writer) 
 Lloy Galpin (suffragist, teacher)
 Jack Kemp (Congressman, quarterback, HUD Secretary - Occidental College alumnus)
 Carlos R. Moreno (jurist)
 Barack Obama (44th President of the United States - Occidental College student)
 Zasu Pitts (actress)
 Hanson Puthuff (artist)
 Mark Ryden (artist)
 Robert Shaw (conductor)
 John Steinbeck (author)
 Madeleine Stowe (actress)
 Marshall Thompson (actor)
 Dalton Trumbo (screenwriter, author)
 Lindsay Wagner (actress)
 Virginia Weidler (actress)  

 Keith Wyatt (Musician, educator)

See also

 Los Angeles Historic-Cultural Monuments on the East and Northeast Side
 List of districts and neighborhoods in Los Angeles

References

External links

 Eagle Rock Neighborhood Council
 Eagle Rock Valley Historical Society
 Eagle Rock crime map and statistics

 
1906 establishments in California
1923 disestablishments in California
Former municipalities in California
Hipster neighborhoods
Neighborhoods in Los Angeles
Northeast Los Angeles
Populated places established in 1906
San Rafael Hills